Great Clips Mohawk Warrior (originally and simply known as Mohawk Warrior) is a monster truck currently racing in the Monster Jam professional monster truck racing series. It is currently driven by Bryce Kenny, and was originally driven by George Balhan, former An Escalade driver, who debuted in 2010 during the Monster Jam World Finals XI Encore in the Obsession Chassis. It features one of the first trucks a decoration on the roof, which is a giant mohawk. The truck is also a successor to An Escalade. It has been sponsored by Great Clips since Bryce Kenny became the new driver of Mohawk Warrior after Balhan retired from Monster Jam.

History
In 2010, The truck debuted at Las Vegas, Nevada, and the truck was driven by George Balhan in the Obsession Chassis in the World Finals 11 Encore, who had previously owned and driven Escalade from the previous years.

In 2011, the truck made its first Monster Jam World Finals appearance with Balhan still behind-the-wheel. He lost to Bounty Hunter in round 1, but  Stone Crusher and Amsoil Shock Therapy trucks won't return, the Mohawk Warrior truck returned for Round 2. He also defeated Monster Mutt Dalmatian in Round 2, Teenage Mutant Ninja Turtles in Round 3, but lost to Bounty Hunter in the semi-finals in Racing. He got a 28 in freestyle which tied with Bounty Hunter and Iron Man. Balhan didn't win any championships that time.

In 2012, Balhan once again competed at the World Finals. Mohawk Warrior was the first truck to do 2 Consecutive Backflips in Freestyle at the World Finals. However, Balhan did it after the scores were in. He lost to Bounty Hunter in Round 1 in Racing. He got a 25 in freestyle which tied with Captain America and Grave Digger. He did his first single backflip in Metlife Stadium, East Rutherford, New Jersey.

In 2013, Balhan competed again at the World Finals. He defeated Monster Mutt Dalmatian in Round 1 and he lost to Grave Digger The Legend in Round 2 in Racing. He got an 8 in freestyle which tied with Advanced Auto Parts Grinder. BJ Johnson is announced to drive a second Mohawk Warrior for the following year.

In 2014, BJ competed in the Young Guns Shootout in the World Finals. However, he defeated Taryn Laskey's Monster Mutt Dalmatian in Round 1, Captain USA in Round 2, but lost to Monster Energy at the Semi-Finals. BJ Johnson's Chassis is used for Titan the following year, when Titan's original chassis is damaged in qualifying at the World Finals. Balhan competed in the World Finals for Racing and Freestyle. However, he defeated Captain America in Round 1 but lost to Max-D in Round 2. He got a 12 in freestyle.

In 2015, BJ competed once again in the Young Guns Shootout. He defeated Cynthia Gauthier's Monster Mutt Dalmatian in Round 1, but lost to Heavy Hitter in Round 2 in the Young Guns Shootout. Balhan gets invited at the World Finals. He lost to Monster Mutt Rottweiler in Round 1 in Racing. He got an 8.5 in freestyle.

In 2016, The truck has brand new beadlocks in each tire. The truck now has a "MOTO METAL" logo at the back of the truck instead of the Mohawk Warrior logo, receiving its sponsorship. Balhan competed at the world finals for the 12th time. He defeated Monster Mutt Junkyard Dog in Round 1, but lost to Adam Anderson's Grave Digger in Round 2 in Racing. He got a 19 in freestyle which tied with Scooby-Doo! and VP Racing Fuels' Mad Scientist. BJ Johnson leaves Mohawk Warrior to drive his new truck, Gas Monkey Garage.

In 2017, Bryce Kenny became the new Mohawk Warrior driver. His truck is now referred to as "Great Clips Mohawk Warrior", with Great Clips being its Sponsor. The truck now has the Great Clips logo is on the truck's hood. The truck also updated its theme song, A Warrior's Call by Volbeat, replacing the original theme song, Warrior by Nelly. Bryce Kenny competed at the World Finals, but lost to Coty Saucier's Monster Energy in Round 1 in Racing. He got an 8.100 in freestyle. Steve Sims drove the Purple Mohawk Warrior, internationally. Camden Murphy drives the truck in Foxboro.

In 2018, The truck had a Brand New Look. It had its Great Clips logo on top of the Mohawk Warrior logo, and the "MOTO METAL" logo is replaced by the truck's logo "Great Clips Mohawk Warrior" is at the back of the truck, ending its sponsorship, which is located at its Tailgate. He attempted his first Backflip in Houston, but rolled-over, landed on its nose, and saved it. However, he did it again (this time, a full backflip, landed it with all 4 wheels) in Atlanta. Bryce once again got invited at the world finals. He got a bye-run due to Overkill Evolution being repaired in Round 1, and got defeated by Adam Anderson's Grave Digger in Round 2 in Racing. He got a 5.492 in freestyle.

Drivers
 George Balhan (2010–17)
 BJ Johnson (2014–16)
 Bryce Kenny (2017–present)
 Steve Sims (Saudi Arabia 2017)
 Camden Murphy (Foxboro 2017)
 Chad Tingler (Arnhem 2011)
 Elvis Lainez (2021)

Awards

Monster Jam World Finals

 2011
Driver: George Balhan
 Racing: Lost to Bounty Hunter in Round 4
Freestyle: Scored 28 - Tied for Fourth with Bounty Hunter and Iron Man

 2012

Driver: George Balhan
Racing: Lost to Bounty Hunter in Round 1
Freestyle: Scored 25 - Tied for Sixth with Grave Digger and Captain America

 2013

Driver: George Balhan
Racing: Lost to Grave Digger The Legend in Round 2
Freestyle: Scored 8 - Tied for Fifteenth with Advance Auto Parts Grinder 

 2014

Driver: George Balhan
Racing: Lost to Max-D in Round 2
Freestyle: Scored 12 - Seventeenth

 2015

Driver: George Balhan
Racing: Lost to Monster Mutt Rottweiler in Round 1
Freestyle: Scored 8.5 - Twenty-fourth 

 2016

Driver: George Balhan
Racing: Lost to Adam Anderson's Grave Digger in Round 2
Freestyle: Scored 19 - Tied for Fifteenth with Mad Scientist and Scooby-Doo!

 2017

Driver: Bryce Kenny
Racing: Lost to Coty Saucier's Monster Energy in Round 1
Freestyle: Scored 8.100 - Eighth

 2018

Driver: Bryce Kenny
Racing: Lost to Adam Anderson's Grave Digger in Round 2
Freestyle: Scored 5.492 - Twenty-third

 2019

Driver: Bryce Kenny
Racing: Lost to Adam Anderson's Grave Digger in Round 2
Freestyle: Scored 8.350 - Eighth

See also
 Monster Truck
 List of Monster Trucks

References

Monster trucks
Off-road vehicles
Sports entertainment
Vehicles introduced in 2010